Li Zhi may refer to:

Emperor Gaozong of Tang (628–683), named Li Zhi, Emperor of China
Li Ye (mathematician) (1192–1279), Chinese mathematician and scholar, birth name Li Zhi
Li Zhi (philosopher) (1527–1602), Chinese philosopher from the Ming Dynasty
Li Zhi (politician) (born 1951), former Communist party boss of Ürümqi
Nina Li Chi (born 1961), or Li Zhi, Hong Kong film actress
Li Zhi (dissident), Chinese dissident
Li Zhi (singer) (born 1978), Chinese singer, banned from China for political “misbehavior”
Li Zhi (footballer) (born 1993), Chinese association footballer

See also
Lychee, lizhi in Chinese
Fang Lizhi, Chinese astrophysicist and dissident